There are several hundred languages in China. The predominant language is Standard Chinese, which is based on central Mandarin, but there are hundreds of related Chinese languages, collectively known as Hanyu ('Han language'), that are spoken by 92% of the population. The Chinese (or 'Sinitic') languages are typically divided into seven major language groups, and their study is a distinct academic discipline. They differ as much from each other morphologically and phonetically as do English, German and Danish, but meanwhile share the same writing system (Hanzi) and are mutually intelligible in written form. There are in addition approximately 300 minority languages spoken by the remaining 8% of the population of China. The ones with greatest state support are Mongolian, Tibetan, Uyghur and Zhuang.

According to the 2010 edition of Nationalencyklopedin, 955 million out of China's then-population of 1.34 billion spoke some variety of Mandarin Chinese as their first language, accounting for 71% of the country's population. According to the 2019 edition of Ethnologue, 904 million people in China spoke some variety of Mandarin as their first language in 2017.

Standard Chinese, known in China as Putonghua, based on the Mandarin dialect of Beijing, is the official national spoken language for the mainland and serves as a lingua franca within the Mandarin-speaking regions (and, to a lesser extent, across the other regions of mainland China). Several other autonomous regions have additional official languages. For example, Tibetan has official status within the Tibet Autonomous Region and Mongolian has official status within Inner Mongolia. Language laws of China do not apply to either Hong Kong or Macau, which have different official languages (Cantonese, English and Portuguese) from the mainland.

Spoken languages
The spoken languages of nationalities that are a part of the People's Republic of China belong to at least nine families:

 The Sino-Tibetan family: 19 official ethnicities (including the Han and Tibetans)
 The Tai–Kadai family: several languages spoken by the Zhuang, the Bouyei, the Dai, the Dong, and the Hlai (Li people). 9 official ethnicities.
 The Hmong–Mien family: 3 official ethnicities
 The Austroasiatic family: 4 official ethnicities (the De'ang, Blang, Gin (Vietnamese), and Wa)
 The Turkic family: Uyghurs, Kazakhs, Salars, etc. 7 official ethnicities.
 The Mongolic family: Mongols, Dongxiang, and related groups. 6 official ethnicities.
 The Tungusic family: Manchus (formerly), Hezhe, etc. 5 official ethnicities.
 The Koreanic family: Korean language
 The Indo-European family: 2 official ethnicities, the Russians and Tajiks (actually Pamiri people). There is also a heavily Persian-influenced Äynu language spoken by the Äynu people in southwestern Xinjiang who are officially considered Uyghurs.
 The Austronesian family: 1 official ethnicity (the Gaoshan, who speak many languages of the Formosan branch), 1 unofficial (the Utsuls, who speak the Tsat language but are considered Hui.)

Below are lists of ethnic groups in China by linguistic classification. Ethnicities not on the official PRC list of 56 ethnic groups are italicized. Respective Pinyin transliterations and Chinese characters (both simplified and traditional) are also given.

Sino-Tibetan
 Sinitic
Chinese, 汉语, 漢語
 Mandarin Chinese, 官话, 官話
 Beijing Mandarin, 北京官话, 北京官話
 Standard Chinese, 普通话, 普通話
 Singaporean Mandarin, 新加坡华语, 新加坡華語
 Malaysian Mandarin, 马来西亚华语, 馬來西亞華語
 Taiwanese Mandarin, 台湾华语, 臺灣華語
 Taipei Mandarin, 台北腔/国语, 臺北腔/國語
 Northeastern Mandarin, 东北官话, 東北官話
 Jilu Mandarin, 冀鲁官话, 冀魯官話
 Jiaoliao Mandarin, 胶辽官话, 膠遼官話
 Zhongyuan Mandarin, 中原官话, 中原官話
 Lanyin Mandarin, 兰银官话, 蘭銀官話
 Lower Yangtze Mandarin, 江淮官话, 江淮官話
 Southwestern Mandarin, 西南官话, 西南官話
 Jin Chinese, 晋语, 晉語
 Wu Chinese, 吴语, 吳語
 Shanghainese, 上海话, 上海話
 Huizhou Chinese, 徽语, 徽語
 Yue Chinese, 粤语, 粤語
 Cantonese, 广东话, 廣東話
 Ping Chinese, 平话, 平話
Gan Chinese, 赣语, 贛語
Xiang Chinese, 湘语, 湘語
Hakka language, 客家话, 客家話
Min Chinese, 闽语, 閩語
 Southern Min, 闽南语, 閩南語
 Hokkien, 泉漳话, 泉漳話
 Teochew dialect, 潮州话, 潮州話
 Eastern Min, 闽东语, 閩東語
 Pu-Xian Min, 莆仙话, 莆仙話
 Leizhou Min, 雷州话, 雷州話
 Hainanese, 海南话, 海南話
 Northern Min, 闽北语, 閩北語
 Central Min, 闽中语, 閩中語
 Shao-Jiang Min, 邵将语, 邵將語
 Bai, 白語
 Dali language, 大理語
 Dali dialect(Bai: Darl lit)
 Xiangyun dialect
 Yitdut language/Jianchuan language, 剑川语, 劍川語
 Yitdut dialect(Bai: Yit dut)
 Heqing dialect(Bai: hhop kait)
 Bijiang language
 Bijiang dialect
 Lanping dialect(Bai: ket dant)

 Tibeto-Burman
 Tujia
 Qiangic
 Qiang
 Northern Qiang
 Southern Qiang
 Prinmi
 Baima
 Tangut
 Bodish
 Tibetan
 Central Tibetan (Standard Tibetan)
 Amdo Tibetan
 Khams Tibetan
 Lhoba
 Monpa/Monba
 Lolo–Burmese–Naxi
 Burmish
 Achang
 Loloish
 Yi
 Lisu
 Lahu
 Hani
 Jino
 Nakhi/Naxi
 Jingpho–Nungish–Luish
 Jingpho
 Derung
 Nu
 Nusu
 Rouruo

Kra–Dai
(Possibly the ancient Bǎiyuè 百越)
 Be
 Kra
 Gelao
 Kam–Sui
 Dong
 Sui
 Maonan
 Mulao/Mulam
 Hlai/Li
 Tai
 Zhuang (Vahcuengh)
 Northern Zhuang
 Southern Zhuang
 Bouyei
 Dai
 Tai Lü language
 Tai Nüa language
 Tai Dam language
 Tai Ya language
 Tai Hongjin language

Turkic
 Karluk
 Ili Turki
 Uyghur
 Uzbek
 Kipchak
 Kazakh
 Kyrgyz
 Tatar
 Oghuz
 Salar
 Siberian
 Äynu
 Fuyu Kyrgyz
 Western Yugur
 Tuvan
 Old Uyghur (extinct)
 Old Turkic (extinct)

Mongolic
 Mongolian
 Oirat
 Torgut Oirat
 Buryat
 Daur
 Southeastern
 Monguor
 Eastern Yugur
 Dongxiang
 Bonan
 Kangjia
 Tuoba (extinct)

Para-Mongolic
 Khitan (extinct)
 Tuyuhun (extinct)

Tungusic
 Southern
 Manchu
 Jurchen
 Xibe
 Nanai/Hezhen
 Northern
 Evenki
 Oroqen

Korean
Korean

Hmong–Mien
(Possibly the ancient Nánmán 南蛮, 南蠻)
 Hmong
 Mien
 She

Austroasiatic
 Palaung-Wa
 Palaung/Blang
 De'ang
 Wa/Va
 Vietnamese/Kinh

Austronesian
 Formosan languages
 Tsat

Indo-European
 Russian
 Tocharian (extinct)
 Saka (extinct)
 Pamiri, (mislabelled as "Tajik")
 Sarikoli
 Wakhi
 Portuguese (spoken in Macau)
 English (spoken in Hong Kong)

Yeniseian
 Jie (Kjet) (extinct) (?)

Unclassified
 Ruan-ruan (Rouran) (extinct)

Mixed
 Wutun (Mongolian-Tibetan mixed language)
 Macanese (Portuguese creole)

Written languages

The following languages traditionally had written forms that do not involve Chinese characters (hanzi):

 The Dai people
 Tai Lü language – Tai Lü alphabet
 Tai Nüa language – Tai Nüa alphabet
 The Daur people - Daur language - Manchu alphabet
 The Hmong people - Hmongic languages - Hmong writing(Pollard script, Pahawh Hmong, Nyiakeng Puachue Hmong, etc.)
 The Kazakhs – Kazakh language – Kazakh alphabets
 The Koreans – Korean language – Chosŏn'gŭl alphabet
 The Kyrgyz – Kyrgyz language – Kyrgyz alphabets
 The Lisu people - Lisu language - Lisu script
 The Manchus – Manchu language – Manchu alphabet
 The Mongols – Mongolian language – Mongolian alphabet
 The Naxi – Naxi language – Dongba characters
 The Qiang people - Qiang language or Rrmea language - Rma script
 The Santa people (Dongxiangs in Chinese) - Santa language - Arabic script
 The Sui – Sui language – Sui script
 The Tibetans – Tibetan language – Tibetan alphabet
 The Uyghurs – Uyghur language – Uyghur Arabic alphabet
 The Xibe – Xibe language – Manchu alphabet
 The Yi – Yi language – Yi syllabary

Many modern forms of spoken Chinese languages have their own distinct writing system using Chinese characters that contain colloquial variants.
These typically are used as sound characters to help determine the pronunciation of the sentence within that language:
 Written Sichuanese - Sichuanese
 Written Cantonese - Cantonese
 Written Shanghainese - Shanghainese
 Written Hakka - Hakka
 Written Hokkien - Hokkien
 Written Teochew - Teochew

Some non-Sinitic peoples have historically used Chinese characters:

 The Koreans – Korean language – Hanja
 The Vietnamese - Vietnamese language - Chữ nôm
 The Zhuang (Tai people) – Zhuang languages – Sawndip
The Bouyei people - Bouyei language - Bouyei writing(方塊布依字)
The Bai people - Bai language - Bai writing(僰文)
The Dong people - Dong language (China) - Dong writing(方塊侗字)

Other languages, all now extinct, used separate logographic scripts influenced by, but not directly derived from, Chinese characters:

 The Jurchens (Manchu ancestors) – Jurchen language – Jurchen script
 The Khitans (Mongolic people) – Khitan language – Khitan large and small scripts
 The Tanguts (Sino-Tibetan people) – Tangut language – Tangut script

During Qing dynasty, palaces, temples, and coins have sometimes been inscribed in five scripts:
 Chinese
 Manchu
 Mongol
 Tibetan
 Chagatai

During the Mongol Yuan dynasty, the official writing system was:
 'Phags-pa script

Chinese banknotes contain several scripts in addition to Chinese script.  These are:
 Mongol
 Tibetan
 Arabic (for Uyghur)
 Latin (for Zhuang)

Other writing system for Chinese languages in China include:
 Nüshu script

Ten nationalities who never had a written system have, under the PRC's encouragement, developed phonetic alphabets. According to a government white paper published in early 2005, "by the end of 2003, 22 ethnic minorities in China used 28 written languages."

Language policy
One decade before the demise of the Qing dynasty in 1912, Mandarin was promoted in the planning for China's first public school system.

Mandarin has been promoted as the commonly spoken language for the country since 1956, based phonologically on the dialect of Beijing. The North Chinese language group is set up as the standard grammatically and lexically. Meanwhile, Mao Zedong and Lu Xun writings are used as the basis of the stylistic standard. Pronunciation is taught with the use of the romanized phonetic system known as pinyin. Pinyin has been criticized for fear of an eventual replacement of the traditional character orthography.

The Chinese language policy in mainland China is heavily influenced by the Soviet nationalities policy and officially encourages the development of standard spoken and written languages for each of the nationalities of China. Language is one of the features used for ethnic identification. In September 1951, the All-China Minorities Education Conference established that all minorities should be taught in their language at the primary and secondary levels when they count with a writing language. Those without a writing language or with an "imperfect" writing language should be helped to develop and reform their writing languages.

However, in this schema, Han Chinese are considered a single nationality and the official policy of the People's Republic of China (PRC) treats the different varieties of Chinese differently from the different national languages, even though their differences are as significant, if not more so, as those between the various Romance languages of Europe.
While official policies in mainland China encourage the development and use of different orthographies for the national languages and their use in educational and academic settings, realistically speaking it would seem that, as elsewhere in the world, the outlook for
minority languages perceived as inferior is grim.
The Tibetan Government-in-Exile argue that social pressures and political efforts result in a policy of sinicization and feels that Beijing should promote the Tibetan language more.
Because many languages exist in China, they also have problems regarding diglossia. Recently, in terms of Fishman's typology of the relationships between bilingualism and diglossia and his taxonomy of diglossia (Fishman 1978, 1980) in China:  more and more minority communities have been evolving from "diglossia without bilingualism" to "bilingualism without diglossia." This could be an implication of mainland China's power expanding.

In 2010, Tibetan students protested against changes in the Language Policy on the schools that promoted the use of Mandarin Chinese instead of Tibetan. They argued that the measure would erode their culture. In 2013, China's Education Ministry said that about 400 million people were unable to speak the national language Mandarin. In that year, the government pushed linguistic unity in China, focusing on the countryside and areas with ethnic minorities.

Mandarin Chinese is the prestige language in practice, and failure to protect ethnic languages does occur. In summer 2020, the Inner Mongolian government announced an education policy change to phase out Mongolian as the language of instructions for humanities in elementary and middle schools, adopting the national instruction material instead. Thousands of ethnic Mongolians in northern China gathered to protest the policy. The Ministry of Education describes the move as a natural extension of the Law of the People's Republic of China on the Standard Spoken and Written Chinese Language of 2000.

Study of foreign languages
English has been the most widely-taught foreign language in China, as it is a required subject for students attending university. Other languages that have gained some degree of prevalence or interest are Japanese, Korean, Spanish, Portuguese, and Russian. During the 1950s and 1960s, Russian had some social status among elites in mainland China as the international language of socialism.

In the late 1960s, English replaced the position of Russian to become the most studied foreign language in China. After the Reform and Opening-up policy in 1988, English was taught in public schools starting in the third year of primary school.

Russian, French, and German language classes have been made widely available in universities and colleges. In Northeast China, there are many bilingual schools (Mandarin-Japanese; Mandarin-Korean; Mandarin-Russian), in these schools, students learn languages other than English.

The Economist reported in 2006 that up to one fifth of the population was learning English. Gordon Brown, the former British prime minister, estimated that the total English-speaking population in China would outnumber the native speakers in the rest of the world in two decades.

There have been a growing number of students studying Arabic, due to reasons of cultural interest and belief in better job opportunities. The language is also widely studied amongst the Hui people. In the past, literary Arabic education was promoted in Islamic schools by the Kuomintang when it ruled mainland China.

There have also been a growing number of students choosing to learn Urdu, due to interest in Pakistani culture, close ties between the respective nations, and job opportunities provided by the CPEC.

Interest in Portuguese and Spanish have increased greatly, due in part to Chinese investment in Latin America as well as in African nations such as Angola, Mozambique, and Cape Verde. Portuguese is also one of the official languages in Macau, although its use had stagnated since the nation's transfer from Portugal to the PRC. It was estimated in 2016 that 2.3% of Macau's locals spoke the language, although with government backing since then, interest in it has increased.

Use of English
In China, English is used as a lingua franca in several fields, especially for business settings, and in schools to teach Standard Mandarin to people who are not Chinese citizens. English is also one of the official languages in Hong Kong.

See also

 Language Atlas of China
 Linguistic Atlas of Chinese Dialects
 Varieties of Chinese
 List of varieties of Chinese
 Han Chinese subgroups
 Demographics of China
 Racism in China
 Hong Kong English
 Languages of Hong Kong
 Culture of Macau
 Macanese Portuguese
 List of ethnic groups in China
 Classification of Southeast Asian languages
 Cantonese
 Standard Chinese
 Chinglish

References

Citations

Sources

Further reading

External links
 Minzu Yuwen (民族语文): Minority Languages of China journal
 Linguistic maps of China on Muturzikin.com
 Audio Bible recordings in various minority languages of China

 
Separatism in China